Seth Owusu (born September 20, 1990, in Accra) is a Ghanaian footballer who last played for  Sagrada Esperança in Angola. He previously played in the Ghana Premier League and for Chivas USA in Major League Soccer.

Career

Club
Owusu began his career in the Ghanaian Second Division with FC Medeama, before signing with First Division club Tarkwa Real United in 2008. In 2009, he moved to Kessben where he played in the Glo Premier League. Kessben's playing license was bought by Tarkwa-based Medeama SC in December 2010, and Owusu's rights were transferred to the new club.

Following an unsuccessful trial with Polish side Legia Warszawa, Owusu moved to the United States in 2011, signing a one-year contract with Chivas USA of Major League Soccer. He made his debut for Chivas on March 29, 2011, in a Lamar Hunt US Open Cup game against the Portland Timbers.

Owusu was released by Chivas USA in late June 2011 due to injury. He was expected back by Chivas but Medeama SC did not release him .

International
Owusu has experience of various youth national teams in Ghana, having played for the BlackStars at U-17 and U-21 level, and being a member of several camps with the full national team. He was named in a Ghana squad picked for a 2012 Africa Cup of Nations qualifier against Sudan at home in October 2010.

See also
 List of current MLS players

References

External links
MLS player profile

1990 births
Living people
Ghanaian footballers
Ghanaian expatriate footballers
Chivas USA players
Académica Petróleos do Lobito players
Accra Hearts of Oak S.C. players
Porcelana FC players
G.D. Sagrada Esperança players
Girabola players
Ghanaian expatriate sportspeople in Angola
Ghanaian expatriate sportspeople in the United States
Expatriate footballers in Angola
Expatriate soccer players in the United States
Association football defenders